Myron Lee Bender (1924–1988) was born in St. Louis, Missouri. He obtained his B.S. (1944) and his Ph.D. (1948) from Purdue University.  The latter was under the direction of Henry B. Hass.  After postdoctoral research under Paul D. Barlett (Harvard University), and Frank H. Westheimer (University of Chicago), he spent one year as a faculty member at the University of Connecticut. Thereafter, he was a professor of Chemistry at Illinois Institute of Technology in 1951, and then at Northwestern University in 1960. He worked primarily in the study of reaction mechanisms and the biochemistry of enzyme action. Myron L. Bender demonstrated the two-step mechanism of catalysis for serine proteases, nucleophilic catalysis in ester hydrolysis and intramolecular catalysis in water.  He also showed that cyclodextrin can be used to investigate catalysis of organic reactions within the scope of host–guest chemistry. Finally, he and others reported on the synthesis of an organic compound as a model of an acylchymotrypsin intermediate.

During his career, Myron L. Bender was an active member of the Chicago Section of the American Chemical Society. He was elected a Fellow of Merton College, Oxford University, and to the National Academy of Sciences, the latter in 1968.  He received an honorary degree from Purdue University in 1969.  He was the recipient of the Midwest Award of the American Chemical Society in 1972.

Professor Bender retired from Northwestern in 1988. Both he and his wife, Muriel S. Bender, died that year.

Research

Research papers
Bender's initial work concerned mechanisms of chemical reactions, and although this continued through his career he became increasingly interested in enzyme mechanisms, especially that of α-chymotrypsin. Later he broadened his interest to encompass other enzymes, such as acetylcholinesterase and carboxypeptidase, and others.

Bender pioneered the use of p-nitrophenyl acetate as a model substrate for studying proteolysis, as it is particularly convenient in spectroscopic experiments. He likewise used imidazole as a model catalyst for shedding light on enzyme action.

He also studied artificial enzymes, starting with modified subtilisin in which a serine residue was replaced by cysteine (replacing an ester group with a thiol). Polgar and Bender laid stress on the fact that the modified enzyme was catalytically active, 
whereas Koshland and Neet, who made essentially the same observation the same year, drew the opposite conclusion, that despite replacing group with one in principle more reactive, the modified enzyme was less effective as a catalyst than the unmodified enzyme. Bender also studied other artificial enzymes, such as cycloamyloses, that were not simply modified natural enzymes.

Bender may have been the first to recognize that the specificity constant (the ratio of catalytic constant to Michaelis constant) provides the best measure of enzyme specificity, and to use the term specificity constant for it, as later recommended by the IUBMB.

Reviews

Bender authored or co-authored several reviews, for example summarizing several years' work on α-chymotrypsin, and proteolytic enzymes in general.

Books

Bender's books primarily concerned catalysis, especially catalysis by enzymes
 and its underlying chemistry, and also cyclodextrin chemistry;

Bender Distinguished Summer Lecturers

The series of Myron L. Bender & Muriel S. Bender Distinguished Summer Lectures in Organic Chemistry was established in 1989 and  hosted by the Department of Chemistry at Northwestern University. The scientists who have given these lectures include
Julius Rebek (1990),
JoAnne Stubbe (1992),
Peter B. Dervan (1993),
Marye Anne Fox (1994),
Richard Lerner (1995),
Eric Jacobsen (1997),
Larry E. Overman (1998),
Ronald Breslow (1999),
Jean Fréchet (2000),
Dale Boger (2001),
|Barbara Imperiali (2003),
François Diederich (2004),
Christopher T. Walsh (2008),
Stephen L. Buchwald (2009),
Paul Wender (2010), and
Kendall Houk (2011).

See also
2-Methylbenzaldehyde
Tetrahedral carbonyl addition compound

References

 Northwestern University Department of Chemistry Brochure for the Myron L. Bender & Muriel S. Bender Distinguished Summer Lectures in Organic Chemistry, 2009.
 Frank H. Westheimer, Myron L. Bender, in Biographical Memoirs, the National Academy of Sciences (includes photograph of Prof. Bender, last accessed November 28, 2009, http://www.nap.edu/readingroom.php?book=biomems&page=mbender.html)

External links
National Academy of Sciences Biographical Memoir

1924 births
1988 deaths
Purdue University alumni
Harvard University alumni
University of Chicago alumni
American biochemists
University of Connecticut faculty
Illinois Institute of Technology faculty
Northwestern University faculty
Members of the United States National Academy of Sciences
Fellows of Merton College, Oxford